John Shuker (8 May 1942 – 29 December 2019) was an English  professional footballer, notable for holding the club record of league appearances for Oxford United. He was with the club on their election to the Football League in 1962 and over the next 15 years played 478 times in the Second, Third and Fourth Divisions.

Shuker was born in Eccles, Greater Manchester. He joined Oxford in 1961, originally playing as a winger. He made his debut in August 1962 and went on to captain the side, playing in a variety of positions. He was awarded a testimonial in 1972, culminating in a match between Oxford and Manchester City at the Manor Ground on 5 May 1972.

His last game for Oxford came in April 1977.

He was a manager for Clanfield.

In May 2001, Shuker was appointed as Director of Football at Milton United. In August 2001, Shuker was appointed as manager of Hellenic League side Witney Academy, staying until February 2002 when the club folded after months after problems with player availability.

References

External links

1942 births
2019 deaths
People from Eccles, Greater Manchester
English footballers
Association football fullbacks
Oxford United F.C. players
English football managers
Witney Town F.C. players
Association football midfielders